Death in Her Hands is a 2020 novel by Ottessa Moshfegh.

Synopsis
Vesta Gul, a 72-year-old widow, is walking her dog in the woods and finds a note that reads: "Her name was Magda. Nobody will ever know who killed her. It wasn't me. Here is her dead body." However, no body is in sight. Vesta becomes obsessed with discovering who Magda was and the circumstances surrounding her death.

Background
Death in Her Hands was originally scheduled to be published by Penguin Press on April 21, 2020, but was postponed due to the COVID-19 pandemic. The novel was ultimately published by Penguin Press on June 23, 2020.

Reception
At the review aggregator website Book Marks, which assigns individual ratings to book reviews from mainstream literary critics, the novel received a cumulative "Positive" rating based on 35 reviews: 7 "Rave" reviews, 19 "Positive" reviews, 8 "Mixed" reviews, and 1 "Pan" review.

In its starred review, Kirkus Reviews called it an "eerie and affecting satire of the detective novel."

In a mixed review, Publishers Weekly criticized the novel's narrative as being overly unreliable and wrote that the novel "lacks the devious, provocative fun of Moshfegh's other work".

References

2020 American novels
Novels by Ottessa Moshfegh
Penguin Press books
Psychological novels
American detective novels
American mystery novels
American thriller novels
Fiction with unreliable narrators
First-person narrative novels